The Head and the Heart is the first studio album by folk rock band The Head and the Heart, released on April 19, 2011, on Sub Pop. A deluxe edition of the album was released in August 2011 and included 'Chasing A Ghost' (live), 'Josh McBride' (Live) and 'Rivers and Roads' (live). Initially, the band had self-released the album in June 2009, selling it at concerts, by word of mouth, and through local record stores. In the ensuing months the album sold 10,000 copies. Their music plays heavily on the trio of vocal harmonies, piano and violin melodies, and prominent drums and percussion. It was the top-selling album of the year 2010 for the independent Sonic Boom Records in the band's home neighborhood of Ballard, Seattle. The song "Rivers and Roads" was used in the series finale of NBC's Chuck,  in the 16th episode of the seventh season of CBS's hit comedy How I Met Your Mother,  also at the season finale of the fourth season of Fox's series New Girl, and also in The Good Doctor.

Track listing
All songs by Josiah Johnson, Jon Russell, Charity Thielen, Kenny Hensley, Chris Zasche and Tyler Williams.

Personnel
Charity Rose Thielen - vocals, violin, percussion
Josiah Johnson - vocals, guitar, percussion
Jonathan Russell - vocals, guitar, percussion
Tyler Williams - drums, percussion, vocals
Chris Zasche - bass, vocals
Kenny Hensley - piano, vocals

Commercial performance 
The Head and the Heart peaked at number 109 with 4,000 copies sold on Billboard 200.

Charts

References

2011 debut albums
Sub Pop albums
The Head and the Heart albums